Thomas Edward Smith  (1871–1929) was a pitcher in Major League Baseball. He played for the Boston Beaneaters, Philadelphia Phillies, Louisville Colonels and St. Louis Browns of the National League from 1894 to 1898. He went to college at Fordham University and the College of the Holy Cross. He later played minor league ball in the New England League in 1899 and Eastern League in 1900.

External links

1871 births
1929 deaths
Major League Baseball pitchers
Boston Beaneaters players
Philadelphia Phillies players
Fordham Rams baseball players
Louisville Colonels players
St. Louis Browns (NL) players
Baseball players from Massachusetts
19th-century baseball players
Albany Senators players
Boston Reds (minor league) players
Hazleton Quay-kers players
Springfield Ponies players
Minneapolis Millers (baseball) players
Cambridge Orphans players
Lowell Orphans players
Manchester Manchesters players
Newport Colts players
Taunton Herrings players
Worcester Farmers players